This is a list of instruments by Hornbostel-Sachs number, covering those instruments that are classified under 112 under that system. These instruments are directly struck idiophones.

112.1 Shaken
Flexatone
Hosho
Jingle bells
Maracas
Rainstick
Tambourine
Vibraslap
112.2 Scraped
Güiro
Kagul
Washboard

References

 http://www.music.vt.edu/musicdictionary/texti/Idiophone.html
 https://web.archive.org/web/20110605070024/http://www.let.uu.nl/~Rudolf.Rasch/personal/Muziekinstrumenten03.PDF
 http://www.wesleyan.edu/vim/svh.html

Notes

Lists of percussion instruments
Lists of musical instruments by Hornbostel–Sachs number